Helotrephidae is a family of aquatic bugs found mainly in the tropical regions with many species in the Oriental Realm and a few from Africa, Madagascar and South America. These bugs are found swimming or walking amid submerged vegetation in stagnant or slow moving, shaded freshwater in forest habitats. They are a sister group of the Pleidae.

Adult bugs in the family Helotrephidae are rounded and similar to Pleidae but the head is fused to the prothorax. The antennae are one or two segmented and the terminal segment has many long hair-like extensions. The scutellum is large and many species are incapable of flight as the hindwings are reduced. The tarsal counts on the fore, mid and hind legs are variable, 3-3-3, 2-2-3, or 1-1-2. Helotrephids are predators feeding on small invertebrates by inserting their proboscis and sucking the body fluids. The obtain air from the water surface and hold a pocket of air between the hemielytra and the abdomen.

References

Nepomorpha
Heteroptera families
Aquatic insects